Tressler is a surname. Notable people with the name include:

Georg Tressler (1917–2007), German film actor and film director
Harry Tressler, fictional character from the BBC medical drama Holby City
Otto Tressler (1871–1965), German film actor
S. K. Tressler, Pakistani Christian and former government minister
Jordan Tressler, Baseball Player

See also
Tressler Bank, Undersea bank of the Southern Ocean